is a former Japanese football player.

Club statistics
Updated to 20 February 2017.

References

External links

Profile at Nara Club

1981 births
Living people
Fukuoka University alumni
Association football people from Fukuoka Prefecture
Japanese footballers
J2 League players
J3 League players
Japan Football League players
Sagan Tosu players
Gainare Tottori players
Iwate Grulla Morioka players
Nara Club players
Expatriate footballers in Thailand
Association football midfielders